Giuseppe Vicino (born 26 February 1993) is an Italian rower. He won the bronze medal in the coxless four, at the Tokyo 2020 Olympic Games.

He won the gold medal in the coxless four at the 2015 World Rowing Championships.

Biography 
Giuseppe started his rowing career in 2005 at Circolo del Remo e della Vela Italia in Naples. In 2010, at the Junior World Championships in Racice he won bronze in the men's eight. In 2013 he joined the Fiamme Gialle rowing club.

References

External links
 

Italian male rowers
Rowers from Naples
1985 births
Living people
Rowers of Fiamme Gialle
World Rowing Championships medalists for Italy
Olympic rowers of Italy
Rowers at the 2016 Summer Olympics
Medalists at the 2016 Summer Olympics
Rowers at the 2020 Summer Olympics
Medalists at the 2020 Summer Olympics
Olympic medalists in rowing
Olympic bronze medalists for Italy
21st-century Italian people